In enzymology, an abscisic-aldehyde oxidase is an enzyme that catalyzes the chemical reaction

abscisic aldehyde + H2O + O2  abscisate + H2O2

The 3 substrates of this enzyme are abscisic aldehyde, H2O, and O2, whereas its two products are abscisate and H2O2.

This enzyme belongs to the family of oxidoreductases, specifically those acting on the aldehyde or oxo group of donor with oxygen as acceptor.  The systematic name of this enzyme class is abscisic-aldehyde:oxygen oxidoreductase. Other names in common use include abscisic aldehyde oxidase, AAO3, AOd, and AOdelta.  This enzyme participates in carotenoid biosynthesis.

References

 
 
 

EC 1.2.3
Enzymes of unknown structure